This page details the match results and statistics of the New Zealand national football team from 2000 until 2019.

Key

Key to matches
Att. = Match attendance
(H) = Home ground
(A) = Away ground
(N) = Neutral ground

Key to record by opponent
Pld = Games played
W = Games won
D = Games drawn
L = Games lost
GF = Goals for
GA = Goals against

A-International results
New Zealand's score is shown first in each case.

Notes

Streaks
Most wins in a row
5, 5 July 2002 – 14 July 2002
5, 17 October 2007 – 10 September 2008
5, 10 June 2012 – 16 October 2012
5, 12 November 2015 – 8 June 2016
Most matches without a loss
9, 10 June 2012 – 5 September 2013
Most draws in a row
4, 15 June 2010 – 9 October 2010
Most losses in a row
7, 15 July 1999 – 21 January 2000
6, 8 June 2003 – 29 May 2004
Most matches without a win
11, 5 June 2010 – 23 May 2012
11, 9 September 2013 – 7 September 2015

Results by opposition

Results by year

Cumulative table includes all results prior to 2000.

See also
New Zealand national football team
New Zealand at the FIFA World Cup
New Zealand at the FIFA Confederations Cup
New Zealand at the OFC Nations Cup

References

2000-19